The Kingman Commercial Historic District is a  historic district along the 300 and 400 blocks of Andy Devine Ave. in Kingman, Arizona. It was listed on the National Register of Historic Places in 1986.  It includes seven contributing properties; it includes Moderne, Queen Anne, and Mission/Spanish Revival designed by W. Royal Lescher and others.

The district includes the Beale Hotel, the Brunswick Hotel, the 1906 Lovin Building, an AT&SF railroad depot, the Luthy Block building, and an archeological site.  The Luthy Block was originally a "simple adobe building" but was expanded in 1908 with brick and was remodeled with Mission Revival parapets;  these parapets were updated in c.1935 to Moderne motifs.

Gallery

References 

Historic districts on the National Register of Historic Places in Arizona
Queen Anne architecture in Arizona
Mission Revival architecture in Arizona
Streamline Moderne architecture in the United States
Geography of Mohave County, Arizona
Buildings and structures in Kingman, Arizona
National Register of Historic Places in Kingman, Arizona